Careful is the second studio album by new wave band The Motels.  It was recorded between March and May 1980, and released in June 1980. The album was produced by John Carter who had produced the group's 1979 debut.

"Danger" was released as the disc's lead single and landed in the Top 20 in France. "Days Are O.K." and "Whose Problem?" became Top 50 songs (and their only chart hits) in the United Kingdom. None of the singles released from the album charted in the United States, but the disc reached #45 on the Billboard album chart in the summer of 1980.  It eventually sold nearly 400,000 copies in America.

With the departure of Jeff Jourard as lead guitarist, Tim McGovern (from the group The Pop) was added as lead guitarist for the group. Recording for the second album began on the 4th of February 1980 and would be completed by May 1980.

"Danger" was the second Motels single that was accompanied by a music video (following 1979's "Total Control").

Track listing

Charts

Weekly charts

Year-end charts

Personnel
Credits are taken from the CD's liner notes.

The Motels
Martha Davis – vocals, rhythm guitar
Tim McGovern – lead guitar
Marty Jourard – keyboards, saxophone
Michael Goodroe – bass
Brian Glascock – drums

Production
Credits are taken from the CD's liner notes.
Produced & Engineered by John Carter
Recorded by Warren Dewey
Assistant Engineering by Richard McKernan
Cover Painting by Duggie Fields - "Acquired Mannerisms"

References

1980 albums
The Motels albums
Capitol Records albums